Sisworo Gautama Putra (May 26, 1938 – January 5, 1993) was an Indonesian film director and screenwriter, best known for his work in the horror film genre.

Biography
Born in Kisaran in North Sumatra,  Sisworo trained as a director in 1961. In 1962 he began working in the studio Gema Period Film. He worked as screenwriter unit manager, production manager and then assistant director.

His solo debut as a director started in 1972 with the film Revenge of the Child Haram, in which the screenplay was also written by him. He was a successful director during the golden age of Indonesian cinema from the 1970s until the early 1990s and often directed popular horror films such as Sundelbolong, Telaga Angker, and Nyi Ageng Ratu Pemika, often working actors such as Suzzanna, Ratno Timoer, Barry Prima, and George Rudy.

His last film, Misteri di Malam Pengantin, was released after his death on January 5, 1993.

Filmography
1962 -	Tudjuh Prajurit		 		
1963 -	Djakarta by Pass 					
1964 -	Ekspedisi Terakhir 					
1965 -	Buruh Pelabuhan 					
1970 -	Honey, Money and Djakarta Fair 		 			
1971 -	Di Udjung Badik 					
1972 -	Angkara Murka and Dendam si Anak Haram 	 				
1973 -	Marabunta and Manusia Terakhir 					
1976 -	Rajawali Sakti and Cinta Kasih Mama 					
1977 -	Papa  and Dua Pendekar Pembelah Langit				
1978 -	Primitif 				
1980 -	Aladin dan Lampu Wasiat and Pengabdi Setan 	
1981 -	Jaka Sembung Sang Penakluk, Srigala and Sundelbolong 					
1982 -	Nyi Blorong 					
1983 -	Nyi Ageng Ratu Pemikat and Perkawinan Nyi Blorong 	 				
1984 -	Usia Dalam Gejolak and Telaga Angker 	 				
1985 -	Bangunnya Nyi Roro Kidul and Ratu Sakti Calon Arang 	 				
1986 -	Malam Jumat Kliwon' and Petualangan Cinta Nyi Blorong 	 				
1987 -	Samson dan Delilah 				
1988 -	Malam Satu Suro, Malu-Malu Mau and Santet 					
1989 -	Wanita Harimau / Santet II and Pusaka Penyebar Maut 					
1990 -	Titisan Dewi Ular 	 				
1991 -	Perjanjian di Malam Keramat and Ajian Ratu Laut Kidul 					
1992 -	Kembalinya si Janda Kembang  				
1993 -	Misteri di Malam Pengantin''

References

External links

Indonesian film directors
1938 births
1993 deaths
People from Asahan Regency
Horror film directors